La Biblioteca Nacional "Miguel Obregón Lizano" is the national library of Costa Rica in San Jose. It is tasked with curating the cultural heritage of Costa Rica and maintains three copies of every book ever published in the country in addition to other works. The library contains study areas and a reference desk but is not a public lending library. The library is located adjacent to the Parque Nacional, placing it in the center of many important government buildings.

The library was created in 1888 absorbing the collection of the University of St. Thomas that had closed in 1885.

References 
Costa Rica libraries website

National libraries
Libraries in Costa Rica
Libraries established in 1888
1888 establishments in Costa Rica